The Apostolic Vicariate of Benghazi is a Latin Church ecclesiastical territory or apostolic vicariate of the Catholic Church in Libya.

It is immediately exempt to the Holy See and not part of any ecclesiastical province. Its cathedral, Benghazi Cathedral, is in the city of Benghazi.

History 
 February 3, 1927: Established as the Apostolic Vicariate of Cyrenaica, on territory split  from the Apostolic Vicariate of Libya.
 On June 22, 1939, renamed as Apostolic Vicariate of Benghazi; lost territory to the newly established Apostolic Vicariate of Derna.

Episcopal ordinaries 

So far all missionary members of the Friars Minor (O.F.M.)

 Apostolic Vicars of Cirenaica
 Bernardino Vitale Bigi, O.F.M., Titular Bishop of Anthedon (January 27, 1927 – April 19, 1930); also Apostolic Administrator of Mogadishu  (Somalia) (1930.03 – 1930.04.19)
 Candido Domenico Moro, O.F.M., Titular Bishop of Uzita (July 14, 1931 – June 22, 1939 see below)

 Apostolic Vicars of Benghazi
 Candido Domenico Moro, O.F.M. (see above June 22, 1939 – 1950)
 Ernesto Aurelio Ghiglione, O.F.M., Titular Bishop of Gauriana (July 5, 1951 – June 8, 1964)
 Giustino Giulio Pastorino, O.F.M., Titular Bishop of Babra (January 11, 1965 – March 10, 1997)
 Sylvester Carmel Magro, O.F.M., Titular Bishop of Saldæ (March 10, 1997 – February 14, 2016)

Apostolic Administrators
 George Bugeja, O.F.M., Titular Bishop of San Leone, Vicar Apostolic of Tripoli (February 14, 2016 – December 8, 2019)
 (Father) Sandro Overend Rigillo, O.F.M. (December 8, 2019 -)

Sources and external links
 GCatholic.org, with incumbent biography links
 Catholic Hierarchy

Roman Catholic dioceses in Libya
Christian organizations established in 1927
Apostolic vicariates
Roman Catholic dioceses and prelatures established in the 20th century
Benghazi
1927 establishments in Libya